Richard Franklin Chew (born June 28, 1940) is an American film editor, best known for his Academy Award-winning work on Star Wars (1977), alongside Paul Hirsch and Marcia Lucas. Other notable films include One Flew Over the Cuckoo's Nest (1975), Risky Business (1983), Waiting to Exhale (1995), That Thing You Do! (1996), and I Am Sam (2001). His career over a variety of films spans more than four decades.

Early life and career 
Born of Chinese immigrant parents in Los Angeles, Chew attended its inner-city schools, served in the U.S. Navy, and graduated from UCLA with a B.A. in Philosophy. After a stint at Harvard Law School, Chew, inspired by the independent cinema of the 1960s, left school to pursue a film career.

Starting with camera and editing work on documentaries, such as The Redwoods, an Oscar winner for Best Short Documentary in 1967, he eventually transitioned to editing feature films as co-editor on Francis Ford Coppola's The Conversation, Miloš Forman's One Flew Over the Cuckoo’s Nest, and George Lucas's Star Wars.

During his varied career, he has edited films for actor-directors such as Jack Nicholson, Tom Hanks, and Forest Whitaker. Other writer-directors with whom Chew has worked include: Cameron Crowe, Paul Brickman, Bruce Joel Rubin, and Emilio Estevez.

Chew was Oscar-nominated for One Flew Over the Cuckoo’s Nest. He also won British Oscars (BAFTA) as co-editor on both The Conversation and One Flew Over the Cuckoo’s Nest. His work on Shanghai Noon was nominated for Best Feature Comedy by American Cinema Editors.

At various times throughout his editing career, Chew has taught and lectured with the goal of enhancing audience appreciation for the cinema arts. For over thirty years, he has appeared at art schools and colleges, churches, and community groups.

On January 27, 2011, he was honored at the Detroit Institute of Arts with “An Evening with Richard Chew,” a program featuring clips of some of his extensive work plus an interview conducted by DIA film curator Elliot Wilhelm.  Additionally, Chew was named Allessee Visiting Professor of Media at Wayne State University for the 2011 Spring semester. In September 2013, Chew was selected as a Duncan Littlefair Great Speaker in the Creation Talks Series (http://www.creationtalks.org/about-us/duncan-littlefair-great-speakers/), joining the ranks of renowned speakers from the worlds of politics and arts. He spoke about the power of music in film at the legendary Fountain Street Church in Grand Rapids, Michigan. . In November, 2016, Chew received the Third Annual Andrew V. McLaglen Lifetime Achievement Award from Friday Harbor Film Festival (Washington).

For his body of work, American Cinema Editors, an honorary society of film editors, presented to Chew the ACE Career Achievement Award during its annual Eddies Award show in March, 2022. In closing his acceptance
speech, Chew said, “I’m thinking maybe we (filmmakers) could make movies to entertain and send a message. Maybe we could use movies to encourage the better angels of our nature.”

He is a member of the Academy of Motion Picture Arts & Sciences, Motion Picture Editors Guild, and American Cinema Editors.

Selected filmography

References

External links

 "Interview with Richard Chew", Editors Guild Magazine, July 25, 2010

1940 births
American Cinema Editors
American film editors
American people of Chinese descent
Best Editing BAFTA Award winners
Best Film Editing Academy Award winners
Living people
People from Los Angeles
University of California, Los Angeles alumni
United States Navy sailors